) is a cluster of Kofun period burial mounds that is located in the Wakayama, in the Kansai region of Japan. One of the largest concentrations of burial mounds in Japan, it consist of over 900 tumuli. It is designated as a National Historic Site in 1931, upgraded to a Special National Historic Site in 1952, and the area under designation expanded in 2016.

Overview
The site is located in the eastern portion of the city of Wakayama,on an east-west extension of the Ryumon Mountains, and west of Yada Pass. It consists of a group of ancient burial mounds related to the kuni no miyatsuko of Kii Province, and consists of approximately 900 kofun, making it one of the largest sites in Japan. These tumuli are divided between the Hanayama branch in the Narugami district in the north and the Ibe Hachiman burial mound in the Okazaki district in the south. In the western portion of the site are the Hinokuma Shrine and Kunikakasu Shrine, which enshrine the spirits of the kuni no miyatsuko. It is believed that these tumuli were all constructed from around the middle of the 4th century, until the proclamation of the Taika Reforms in the middle of the 7th century. With regards to the burial facilities, the earliest kofun had clay-lined burial chambers with box-type sarcophagus. This evolved into chlorite schist-lined stone chambers for later burials. The schist was separated into slabs, which were stacked to form the walls, into which several stone beams were embedded for structural integrity, and the ceiling was covered with large stones. 

Excavations began in 1906, and have been ongoing intermittently to then present day. Many of the finds from the site are on display at the Kiifudoki-no-oka Museum of History.

Gallery

See also
List of Historic Sites of Japan (Wakayama)

References

External links

 
 

Kofun
History of Wakayama Prefecture
Special Historic Sites
Wakayama (city)